Georgi Slavkov (April 11, 1958 – January 21, 2014) was a Bulgarian football player who played as a forward. Slavkov played for Trakia Plovdiv, CSKA Sofia, Saint-Étienne and Chaves. He also gained 30 Bulgaria caps between 1978 and 1984, scoring 12 goals.

Career
Slavkov began his career as a youth player with Trakia Stamboliyski, before joining Trakia Plovdiv in 1973.

Slavkov scored 61 goals in 112 games for Trakia between 1976 and 1982. During the 1980–81 season, he scored 31 league goals in 23 league games to become A PFG top goalscorer and to win the European Golden Shoe.

With CSKA Sofia he played between 1982 and 1986, scoring 48 goals. Then he was transferred to the French club AS Saint-Étienne. He finished his career in Portugal in 1992.

In his career Slavkov participated in 4 Plovdiv Derby matches, scoring one goal, as well as 7 Eternal Derby encounters, netting once.

Between 1978 and 1984, he won 30 caps for Bulgaria and scored 11 goals.

Slavkov died suddenly on Jan 21, 2014 in Plovdiv after suffering a heart attack at the age of 55.

Honours

Club
Botev Plovdiv
 Bulgarian Cup: 1980–81

CSKA Sofia
 A Group (2): 1979–80, 1982–83
 Bulgarian Cup: 1984–85
 Cup of the Soviet Army (2): 1984–85, 1985–86

Individual 
 A Group Top Scorer: 1980–81 (31 goals)
 European Golden Shoe: 1981

References

External links
 

1958 births
2014 deaths
Bulgarian footballers
Bulgaria international footballers
Botev Plovdiv players
PFC CSKA Sofia players
AS Saint-Étienne players
G.D. Chaves players
Bulgarian expatriate footballers
Expatriate footballers in France
Expatriate footballers in Portugal
Bulgarian expatriate sportspeople in France
Bulgarian expatriate sportspeople in Portugal
First Professional Football League (Bulgaria) players
Ligue 1 players
Macedonian Bulgarians
People from Gotse Delchev
Association football forwards
Sportspeople from Blagoevgrad Province